The Soninho River  is a river of Tocantins state, Brazil. It is a headwater of the Do Sono River. 

The Soninho river forms on the northeast boundary of the  Jalapão State Park, a fully protected conservation unit created in 2001.
It runs west along the north boundary of the park to the point where it meets the Novo River from the right to form the Do Sono River.

See also
List of rivers of Tocantins

References

Rivers of Tocantins